Sandwell is a metropolitan borough of the West Midlands county in England. The borough is named after the Sandwell Priory, and spans a densely populated part of the West Midlands conurbation. According to Sandwell Metropolitan Borough Council, the borough comprises the six amalgamated towns of Oldbury, Rowley Regis, Smethwick, Tipton, Wednesbury, and West Bromwich, although these places consist of numerous smaller settlements and localities. 

Sandwell's Strategic Town Centre is designated as West Bromwich, the largest town in the borough, while Sandwell Council House (the headquarters of the local authority) is situated in Oldbury. In 2019 Sandwell was ranked 12th most deprived of England's 317 boroughs.

Bordering Sandwell is the City of Birmingham to the east, the Metropolitan Borough of Dudley to the south and west, the Metropolitan Borough of Walsall to the north, and the City of Wolverhampton to the north-west. Spanning the borough are the parliamentary constituencies of West Bromwich West, West Bromwich East, Warley, and part of Halesowen and Rowley Regis, which crosses into the Dudley borough.

History and culture

The Metropolitan Borough of Sandwell was formed on 1 April 1974 as an amalgamation of the county boroughs of Warley (ceremonially within Worcestershire) and West Bromwich (ceremonially within Staffordshire), under the Local Government Act 1972. Warley had been formed in 1966 by a merger of the county borough of Smethwick with the municipal boroughs of Rowley Regis and Oldbury; at the same time, West Bromwich had absorbed the boroughs of Tipton and Wednesbury.

For its first 12 years of existence, Sandwell had a two-tier system of local government; Sandwell Council shared power with the West Midlands County Council. In 1986 the county council was abolished, and Sandwell effectively became a unitary authority. The borough is divided into 24 Wards and is represented by 72 ward councillors on the borough council.

The borough was named after Sandwell Priory, the ruins of which are located in Sandwell Valley. Gaining widespread acceptance for the identity of Sandwell and unifying the distinct communities within the borough has been a protracted affair. The local council has considered changing its name over confusion outside the West Midlands as to the whereabouts of the borough. A survey of borough residents in June 2002 found that 65 per cent of respondents favoured retaining the name.

Landmarks and attractions in Sandwell include Wednesbury Museum and Art Gallery, Bishop Asbury Cottage, West Bromwich Manor House, Oak House, West Bromwich, and Sandwell Valley Country Park. It is also the home of West Bromwich Albion F.C.

Sandwell used to be a popular hotspot for car cruising. In 2015 a High Court order was introduced to ban car cruising in the area. An extension has been secured to run until at least 2021.

Demographics

Religion 2021

Politics

Since the council election in 2021, the political composition of the council has been as follows:

From the borough's creation in 1974 until 2010, all Members of Parliament (MPs) within its boundaries were Labour. However, in the 2010 general election, Conservative party candidate James Morris was elected to the Halesowen and Rowley Regis seat which incorporates the Sandwell communities of Rowley Regis, Blackheath and Cradley Heath, and the neighbouring area of Halesowen which is situated within Dudley's borders. This was the very first time any part of Sandwell had elected a Conservative MP – or indeed an MP from any party other than Labour. In the December 2019 general election, however, Conservative candidates Nicola Richards and Shaun Bailey were elected to represent West Bromwich East and West Bromwich West respectively. This was the first time since the borough's creation that West Bromwich has returned any Conservative MPs to Parliament, and the first time that a constituency fully within the boundaries of Sandwell Metropolitan Borough Council has been represented by a Tory MP. The election of both Richards and Bailey has been marked as a significant milestone in the political history of the borough and marked the end to decades of control by Labour MPs.

Wards
The Sandwell Borough is divided into 24 electoral wards, with each one represented by 3 councillors on the borough council:

Education

Sandwell is home to nearly 100 primary schools, 25 secondary schools, 4 special schools and 1 college.

The sole further education college in the borough, Sandwell College was opened in September 1986 following the merger of Warley College and West Bromwich College. It was originally based in the old Warley College buildings on Pound Road, Oldbury, and the West Bromwich College buildings on West Bromwich High Street, as well as a building in Smethwick town centre, but moved into a new single site campus in West Bromwich town centre in September 2012. In 2004, a debt-ridden Sandwell College was subject to a police investigation.

Localities

The six towns that comprise Sandwell and localities within each include:
Oldbury
Brandhall
Langley Green
Oakham
Rood End
Rowley Regis
Blackheath
Cradley Heath
Old Hill
Tividale
Smethwick
Albion Estate
Black Patch & Soho
Bearwood
Cape Hill
Londonderry
North Smethwick
Uplands
West Smethwick
Tipton
Dudley Port
Great Bridge
Horseley Heath
Ocker Hill
Princes End
Summer Hill
West Bromwich
Charlemont and Grove Vale
Great Barr (although some areas are part of Birmingham and Walsall)
Guns Village
Hamstead
Hill Top
Newton
Stone Cross
Yew Tree
Greets Green
Hateley Heath
Wednesbury
Friar Park

Local places of interest 
The Public, West Bromwich
Sandwell Aquatics Centre
Sandwell Priory
Sandwell Valley
Sandwell Valley Country Park
RSPB Sandwell Valley
Sheepwash Urban Park
The Hawthorns
Sandwell General Hospital
Sandwell College
Holly Lodge High School
Warley Woods

Twin towns and cities
Sandwell is twinned with:

 Le Blanc Mesnil, France
 Amritsar, India
 Zalau, Romania

See also
Wednesbury Central railway station
Wednesbury bus station
Wednesbury Town railway station
Healthcare in West Midlands

References

External links

Sandwell MBC
Research Sandwell
Sandwell Trends – a Local Intelligence System for Sandwell
Sandwell Building Schools for the Future
Sandwell Lions Club

 
Metropolitan boroughs of the West Midlands (county)
NUTS 3 statistical regions of the United Kingdom
Black Country Local Enterprise Partnership